SPIKE (Signaling Pathways Integrated Knowledge Engine) is a database of highly curated interactions for particular human pathways.

Development
SPIKE was developed by Ron Shamir's computational biology group in cooperation with the group of Yosef Shiloh, an Israel Prize recipient for his research in systems biology, and the group of Karen Avraham, a leading researcher of human deafness, all from Tel Aviv University.

See also
 Signaling pathways

References

External links
 Official website

Biological databases
Cell signaling
Signal transduction
Systems biology